Aminopeptidase III may refer to one of two enzymes:
Leucyl aminopeptidase
Aminopeptidase I